Luke Webb (born 12 September 1986 in Nottingham) is an English footballer who most recently played for Hereford United as a midfielder.

He signed for Arsenal at the age of 11 and progressed through the various youth teams. He was a regular for Arsenal U18s with 20 appearances and 2 goals in the 2004–05 season. With opportunities hard to come by, he left Highbury and had a trial with Wycombe, where he injured his ankle, before joining Coventry City for the 2005–06 season. His opportunities were again limited to reserve team football and he had a trial for Hereford after one season at Coventry. Despite a hamstring injury he impressed at Edgar Street and was signed in September 2006.

He made his first-team debut away to Wrexham, coming on as a substitute in the 1–0 defeat. On 21 November he started and scored in the 2–0 win in the FA Cup over Shrewsbury, following it up with an opening goal against Port Vale in the Second Round. In the final matches of the season, Webb forced his way into the starting XI after an injury to loanee Steve Jennings.

His 2007–08 season was curtailed by a long-term hip injury, making only 15 appearances and scoring 3 goals. He suffered a further injury setback in August 2008 and, with the club having fulfilled their contractual obligations, he was released.

Currently, Luke Webb works at Bradfield College, Berkshire where he teaches Business at A Level. And has created a holistic football education programme, that has facilitated the development of professional footballers as well as some of the best under 18 football teams in the UK.

Footballing family
Luke's father is the former England midfielder Neil Webb. His brother Joshua is also a footballer, currently at Weymouth.

External links
Official Hereford United Profile

1986 births
Living people
English footballers
Arsenal F.C. players
Coventry City F.C. players
Hereford United F.C. players
Footballers from Nottingham
Association football midfielders